The 2014–15 season was Bristol City's 117th season as a professional football club and their second consecutive season in the 3rd Division of the Football League since their relegation from the Championship.

The club enjoyed a memorable season of success, earning promotion while winning a double of the Football League Trophy, and in doing so becoming the first club to win the trophy three times, and the League One title, the club's first league title in 60 years.

Squad

Statistics

|-
|colspan="14"|Players currently out on loan:

|-
|colspan="14"|Players who have left the club during the season:

 

|}

Captains

Goalscorers

Disciplinary record

Contracts

Transfers

In

Loans in

Out

Loans out

Match details

Pre-season

League One

League table

Results Summary

Results by round

Matches

FA Cup

The draw for the first round of the FA Cup was made on 27 October 2014.

League Cup

Football League Trophy

Overall summary

Summary

Score overview

References

Bristol City F.C. seasons
Bristol City